Ahudasht or Ahu Dasht may refer to:
 Ahu Dasht, Nur, Mazandaran Province
 Ahu Dasht, Sari, Mazandaran Province
 Ahu Dasht, alternate name of Ahi Dasht, Sari County, Mazandaran Province
 Ahudasht Rural District, in Khuzestan Province